Frank Fischer is an East German sprint canoer who competed from 1981 to 1986. He won nine medals at the ICF Canoe Sprint World Championships with four golds (K-2 500 m: 1983, K-2 1000 m: 1983, K-4 500 m: 1985, 1986), three silvers (K-2 1000 m: 1981, 1986; K-4 500 m: 1982), and two bronzes (K-2 500 m: 1981, K-4 1000 m: 1985).

Personal life
Fischer's wife, Sarina, won a gold medal in women's swimming at the 1980 Summer Olympics in Moscow in the 4 x 100 m freestyle relay (anchor leg) and competed in the qualifying round of the 4 x 100 m medley relay. His daughter, Fanny, won the gold medal in the K-4 500 m event at the 2008 Summer Olympics in Beijing along with nine ICF Canoe Sprint World Championships medals of her own. His sister, Birgit Fischer, won twelve medals in canoeing at the Summer Olympics between 1980 and 2004. Fischer's son, Falco, is also a canoer.

References

German male canoeists
Living people
Year of birth missing (living people)
ICF Canoe Sprint World Championships medalists in kayak